The Day Lincoln Was Shot is a 1998 American television film based on the book by Jim Bishop. It is a re-creation of the assassination of Abraham Lincoln, co-written and directed by John Gray, and stars Lance Henriksen as Abraham Lincoln and Rob Morrow as John Wilkes Booth.

The book had previously been adapted in 1956 as a live television play starring Raymond Massey as Lincoln, Lillian Gish as Mary, and Jack Lemmon as John Wilkes Booth. It was telecast on the CBS anthology series Ford Star Jubilee.

The film shows the events leading up to and after the assassination of Abraham Lincoln as well as a look into the personal lives of both men.

Plot
Abraham Lincoln is relieved that Richmond has fallen and the U.S. Civil War is effectively over. He has contentious discussions with his Cabinet about the treatment of the defeated Confederacy. Many members want the Confederates punished, but Lincoln argues for mercy. The President is despised by many Confederates and receives numerous death threats. Lincoln has a rather fatalistic attitude about them but as a disturbing dream about hearing cries in the White House and seeing a coffin in the East Room surrounded by mourners crying out that an assassin has murdered the President. Booth is the most popular actor in the country (it is pointed out that only Lincoln has his picture taken more often).

Coming from an acting family, he feels overshadowed by his father and brother and longs to make his mark on history. A fanatical Confederate sympathizer, Booth sees Lincoln as a tyrant and slavery as a proper way of life and assembles a motley group of Confederates, including former Soldier Lewis Powell and simple-minded David Herold. They form a plot to kidnap the President, but the war ends. Booth is outraged when he hears Lincoln making a speech promising African-Americans citizenship and the vote. His changes his plot from kidnapping to murder.

Booth decides to assassinate Lincoln at Ford's Theatre, orders Powell to kill Secretary of State William Seward, and orders another henchman, George Adzerodt, to kill Vice President Andrew Johnson. Later that night at the play at Ford's Theater, Booth kills Lincoln and escapes after stabbing Major Henry Rathbone, a substitute guest, and landed awkwardly on the stage. Almost the same time that happens, Powell attacks Seward who survives and the Vice President is unharmed because Adzerodt couldn't have the courage to shoot him. Lincoln is attended by the doctors before being carried to the Petersen House, where he died the following morning at 7:22 A.M. surrounded by his friends and family for the remaining 8 hours. After an intense manhunt for 2 weeks, Boston Corbett shoots Booth inside a burning barn surrounded by federal troops. He dies on the front porch saying that he died for his country.

The credits reveal that Booth's henchmen and Mary Surratt were put on trial and hanged. Ironically, Lincoln's successor Johnson was much harsher on the defeated South than Lincoln would have been.

Cast

Home releases
The film was first released on VHS in 2000 from Warner Home Video. The film is now available on DVD via the burn-on-demand Warner Archive service.

References

External links
The Day Lincoln Was Shot at the Internet Movie Database
The Day Lincoln Was Shot at TNT

1998 films
1998 television films
Assassination of Abraham Lincoln
Depictions of Abraham Lincoln on film
Cultural depictions of John Wilkes Booth
Cultural depictions of Ulysses S. Grant
Films scored by Mark Snow
Films about actors
Films about assassinations
Films about presidents of the United States
Films based on non-fiction books
Films directed by John Gray (director)
Films set in 1865
TNT Network original films
1990s English-language films